Vera Venczel (born Veronika Venczel; 10 March 1946 – 22 October 2021) was a Hungarian actress.

Selected filmography
 Kárpáthy Zoltán (1966)
 Three Nights of Love (1967)
 Stars of Eger (1968)
 The Toth Family (1969)
  (1972)
 The Gambler (1977 film) (1997)
 Rokonok (2006)

Bibliography
 Burns, Bryan. World Cinema: Hungary. Fairleigh Dickinson University Press, 1996.

References

External links

1946 births
2021 deaths
Hungarian film actresses
Hungarian television actresses
Actresses from Budapest
20th-century Hungarian actresses
21st-century Hungarian actresses